Mathematical operator can refer to:

 Operator (mathematics), a concept in mapping vector spaces
 Operation (mathematics), the basic symbols for addition, multiplication etc.
 Mathematical Operators (Unicode block), containing characters for mathematical, logical, and set notation